Freakshow is a 2007 independent film which was made by The Asylum, directed by Drew Bell. It is an unofficial remake of the Tod Browning film Freaks. According to the film poster and DVD cover art, Freakshow is banned in 43 countries, though there is no mention of which countries banned it.

Plot

Freakshow portrays a gang of thieves, working as security guards in a traveling carnival, who plot to steal their rich owner's fortune.

Lucy, one of the thieves, attempts to take the fortune by herself by seducing the Boss and marrying him. The youngest member of the Freakshow, Kimmie stumbles across a few of the gang members stealing food and she is murdered by the thieves. When the murder is discovered, the freaks plot revenge. In a variety of gruesome ways, the thieves are murdered by the freaks. Lucy attempts to escape punishment by swearing her love for the carnival Boss. The freaks "spare" her by giving her a Freakshow "act" which will make her a full member of their troupe. They mutilate her, cut out her tongue, sew her mouth shut, strip her flesh, and cut off her limbs before finally displaying her in the Freakshow Gallery as the "Worm Girl".

Cast
 Christopher Adamson as The Boss (Lon)
 Rebekah Kochan as Lucy
 Dane Rosselli as Hank 
 Mighty Mike Murga as Curtis the Dwarf 
 Jeffrey Allen as Strongman 
 Diego Barquinero as The Wolfman
 Jimmy Goldman as The Great Riwami 
 Sharon Edrei as Sherri
 Amy Dunton as Bobby-Bobbie 
 Amanda Ward as Cannibal Girl 
 McKenna Geu as Little Kimmie 
 John Karyus as Elephant Man
 Stefanie Naifeh as Bearded Lady
 Evan Block as Human Shadow 
 Bill Quinn as The Chef (Legless Man)
 Etta Devine as Mongoloid
 Ken Gardner as Clown
 Wayne Baldwin as Narrator

Production 

The film was heavily inspired by Tod Browning's 1932 horror film Freaks. Many of the film's cast were actual circus performers and disabled actors which was also inspired by Browning's film.

Release
Freakshow was released on DVD January 30, 2007. It was later re-released on DVD by Echo Bridge Home Entertainment on May 18, 2010.

Reception

Critical reception for the film has been mostly negative. 
Horror News.net gave the film a negative review stating, "Freakshow is not a movie I recommend, not because it is controversial, but because it is watered down and bland. That being said, I’m not against giving the writer and/or director another shot if I see their names on a different movie; we all make mistakes, and hopefully we learn from our biggest ones".
Eat Horror panned the film, calling the film's acting and script "awful", also criticizing the film's unsympathetic characters, and over the top gore.

References

External links
Official site at The Asylum

2007 films
2007 horror films
2007 direct-to-video films
2007 independent films
2007 psychological thriller films
American horror films
The Asylum films
American independent films
Films set in the 1930s
Remakes of American films
Circus films
Films about disability
Films about intellectual disability
Films about sideshow performers
Films about people with dwarfism
Films about paraplegics or quadriplegics
Horror films about clowns
Horror film remakes
2000s English-language films
2000s American films